The Humacao River is a river of Humacao, Puerto Rico and is in Las Piedras municipality, as well.

See also
List of rivers of Puerto Rico

References

External links
 USGS Hydrologic Unit Map – Caribbean Region (1974)
 Rios de Puerto Rico

Rivers of Puerto Rico